Banksetosa is a genus of Panamanian jumping spiders that was first described by Arthur Merton Chickering in 1946.  it contains only two species, found only in Panama: B. dubia and B. notata. It is named in honor of Nathan Banks.

References

Salticidae genera
Salticidae
Spiders of Central America